Victor Nicholas Alessandro (November 27, 1915 – November 27, 1976) was an American orchestral conductor.

Conducting career 
In 1938, at age 22, he became conductor of the Oklahoma City Symphony Orchestra, an organization that he led from a WPA project to an accomplished ensemble with broad civic support. When Max Reiter, conductor of the San Antonio Symphony Orchestra, died in December 1950, Alessandro took over much of the remaining season; he signed a contract as permanent conductor in April 1951. The next year he also assumed leadership of the San Antonio Symphony Society's Grand Opera Festival.

Alessandro was at his best in works by Tchaikovsky, Wagner and Richard Strauss. He was a sympathetic interpreter of Johannes Brahms and the odd-numbered symphonies of Ludwig van Beethoven. He introduced works by Anton Bruckner, Gustav Mahler, and Alban Berg to San Antonio audiences before they became fashionable elsewhere. He conducted memorable performances of Elektra, Salome, Nabucco, Boris Godunov, Susannah, Die Meistersinger, and the standard operas of Giuseppe Verdi and Giacomo Puccini. In building the San Antonio orchestra he was an exacting, often irascible taskmaster of high musical standards. But he was capable of less formidable moments as well; in February 1962, for instance, he dedicated a performance of Ein Heldenleben to the memory of Bruno Walter.

Growing up 
He was born in Waco, Texas, on November 27, 1915.  His father, Victor Alessandro (1883–1971) was a prominent conductor and music teacher in public schools.  The Alessandros moved to Houston in 1919. Victor was introduced to music at an early age and studied French horn with his father. He made his conducting debut at age four, when he led a children's band in a performance of Victor Herbert's March of the Toys.

Higher education 
In 1932, he entered the Eastman School of Music in Rochester, New York, where he studied composition with Howard Hanson. He then studied at the Salzburg Mozarteum and the St. Cecilia Academy in Rome, where he studied with Ildebrando Pizzetti.

Honors 
Alessandro received three honorary doctorates:

 Eastman School of Music, University of Rochester, 1948 (as of 1964, Alessandro was the only graduate of Eastman an honorary Ph.D. degree in music conferred on him by the University of Rochester)
 Southwestern University, Georgetown, Texas, May 1975
 Doctor of Humanities, Southern Methodist University, May 1956

In 1956, he received the Alice M. Ditson Award for service to American music.

Selected discography 
Recordings of his work include Claude Debussy's Martyrdom of St. Sebastian (1950), light accompaniments (ca. 1953), Antonio Vivaldi and Rodrigo guitar concertos and works by Richard Strauss and John Corigliano (1967–68).

Family 
In 1956, he married flutist Ruth Drisko (1926–1996).  They had two children, Victor Tabbut Alessandro (born 1958) and Ruth Ann Alessandro (1959–1992).  With his health declining, Alessandro retired in 1976.  He died in San Antonio on November 27, 1976, his sixty-first birthday.

See also
 The Conductor (sculpture)

Sources
General references

 Theodore Albrecht, "101 Years of Symphonic Music in San Antonio," Southwestern Musician/Texas Music Educator, March, November 1975
 Baker's Biographical Dictionary of Musicians, 1978
 Hope Stoddard, Symphony Conductors of the U.S.A. (New York: Crowell, 1957). Theodore Albrecht Edited by Victor T. Alessandro 2012
 The New Encyclopedia of the Opera. By David Ewen. New York: Hill & Wang, 1971
 Who's Who in Opera. An international biographical directory of singers, conductors, directors, designers, and administrators. Also including profiles of 101 opera companies. Edited by Maria F. Rich. New York: Arno Press, 1976
 Baker's Biographical Dictionary of Musicians. Sixth edition. Revised by Nicolas Slonimsky. London: Collier Macmillan Publishers
 Baker's Biographical Dictionary of Musicians. Seventh edition. Revised by Nicolas Slonimsky. New York: Macmillan Publishing Co., Schirmer Books, 1984
 Biography Index. A cumulative index to biographical material in books and magazines. Volume 4: September, 1955-August, 1958. New York: H.W. Wilson Co., 1960
 Biography Index. A cumulative index to biographical material in books and magazines. Volume 8: September, 1967-August, 1970. New York: H.W. Wilson Co., 1971
 Biography Index. A cumulative index to biographical material in books and magazines. Volume 11: September, 1976-August, 1979. New York: H.W. Wilson Co., 1980
 The New Grove Dictionary of American Music. Four volumes. Edited by H. Wiley Hitchcock & Stanley Sadie. London: Macmillan Press, 1986
 The New York Times Biographical Service. A compilation of current biographical information of general interest. Volume 7, Numbers 1- 12. New York: Arno Press, 1976
 The Blue Book. Leaders of the English-speaking world. 1976 edition. New York: St. Martin's Press, 1976
 Baker's Biographical Dictionary of Musicians. Eighth edition. Revised by Nicolas Slonimsky. New York: Macmillan Publishing Co., 1992
 Baker's Biographical Dictionary of Musicians. Ninth edition. edited by Laura Kuhn. New York: Schirmer Books, 2001
 Baker's Biographical Dictionary of Twentieth-Century Classical Musicians. By Nicolas Slonimsky. New York: Schirmer Books, 1997
 International Who's Who in Music and Musicians' Directory. Ninth edition. Edited by Adrian Gaster. Cambridge, England: International Who's Who in Music, 1980. Earlier editions published as Who's Who in Music and Musicians' International Directory
 Who Was Who in America. Volume 7, 1977-1981. Chicago: Marquis Who's Who, 1981
 The International Who's Who. 38th edition. London: Europa Publications, 1974
 The International Who's Who. 39th edition. London: Europa Publications, 1975
 The International Who's Who. 40th edition. London: Europa Publications, 1976
 International Who's Who in Music and Musicians' Directory. Eighth edition. Cambridge, England: International Who's Who in Music, 1977. Earlier editions published as Who's Who in Music and Musicians' International Directory.
 Who's Who in America. 38th edition, 1974-1975. Wilmette, IL: Marquis Who's Who, 1974
 Who's Who in America. 39th edition, 1976-1977. Wilmette, IL: Marquis Who's Who, 1976
 Who's Who in Music and Musicians' International Directory. Sixth edition. New York: Hafner Publishing Co., 1972
 Who's Who in the South and Southwest. 13th edition, 1973-1974. Wilmette, IL: Marquis Who's Who, 1973
 Who's Who in the South and Southwest. 14th edition, 1975-1976. Wilmette, IL: Marquis Who's Who, 1975
 Who's Who in the South and Southwest. 15th edition, 1976-1977. Wilmette, IL: Marquis Who's Who, 1976
 The International Who's Who. 41st edition. London: Europa Publications, 1977 (the obituary section is located at the front of the volume)

Inline citations

1915 births
1976 deaths
American male conductors (music)
American classical musicians
Eastman School of Music alumni
Musicians from San Antonio
20th-century American conductors (music)
Classical musicians from Texas
20th-century American male musicians